Lázaro de Tormes is a 2001 Spanish comedy film directed by Fernando Fernán Gómez and José Luis García Sánchez which stars Rafael Álvarez "El Brujo" as the title character.

Plot 
Set in the 16th century, the plot concerns about a trial on an adult Lázaro in Toledo. As part of his defence, the character goes on to tell the jury the story of his life (displayed through flashbacks). Rather than Lázaro's ability to persuade the folks, he is "saved" by the deus ex machina arrival of Holy Roman Emperor Charles V to the city.

Cast

Production 
Written by Fernando Fernán Gómez, the screenplay is an adaptation of a stage monologue (based in turn on the early modern work). It was initially helmed by Fernando Fernán Gómez, but José Luis García Sánchez took over direction duties and completed the film in the wake of Fernán Gómez's illness during production. Shooting locations included Lupiana and Atienza (province of Guadalajara); Talamanca de Jarama (Madrid region) and Toledo.

Release 
The film was theatrically released on 19 January 2001.

Accolades 

|-
| rowspan = "5" align = "center" | 2001 || rowspan = "5" | 15th Goya Awards || Best Adapted Screenplay || Fernando Fernán Gómez ||  || rowspan = "5" | 
|-
| Best Production Supervision || Carmen Martínez Muñoz || 
|-
| Best Art Direction || Luis Ramírez || 
|-
| Best Costume Design || Javier Artiñano || 
|-
| Best Makeup and Hairstyles || Juan Pedro Hernández, Esther Martín || 
|}

See also 
 List of Spanish films of 2001

References 

Films set in Toledo, Spain
Films set in the 16th century
Spanish historical comedy films
2000s Spanish films
2000s Spanish-language films
Films shot in the province of Toledo
Films shot in the Community of Madrid
Films shot in the province of Guadalajara
LolaFilms films